Reichenwalde is a municipality in the Oder-Spree district, in Brandenburg, Germany.

Demography

Notable people
Wolfgang Kohlhaase (1931-2022) - acclaimed screenwriter, who lived in Reichenwalde

References

Localities in Oder-Spree